Nenjam Marappathillai is a 2017 Tamil-language soap opera starring Sharanya Turadi and Amit Bhargav. Its main plot has been taken from the Bengali language love series Kusum Dola and with different story and screenplay by Rasool. It was aired from 9 October 2017 on Vijay TV and replaced the serial Mappillai. This serial is a love story about Saranya (Sharanya Turadi) and Vikram (Amit Bhargav) whose lives got changed after certain incident. This TV series has ended on 22 February 2019 as Amit Bhargav left the serial. It has been replaced with the new serial Barathi Kannamma.

Plot
Saranya, the small town, good-hearted daughter of a police officer lives in Kodaikanal. She is a new MBBS graduate and is planning to do post-graduation in Surgery in Chennai. She loves everyone in her town.

Vikram is an aspiring IPS officer from a joint family where people have different thoughts. On a trip Vikram meets Sathya and both develop feelings for each other but they can not express their feelings. Vikram gets posted to Kodaikanal, but accidentally he loses his phone and cannot contact Sathya, making her feel cheated. Soon, she gets engaged to Vikram's brother, Arjun. Vikram, despite knowing this, refuses to break their marriage and gave promise that he never love any women. After the marriage, Arjun learns of their story and leaves the house, without telling the truth to anyone.

Due to circumstances, Saranya loses her father in a botched police operation to catch a thug, who wanted to forcefully wed Saranya. Saranya feels that IPS officer Vikram is one of the reasons for her father's death, as Vikram inadvertently brought him to the field. Orphan Saranya tries to commit suicide after that. Her villagers force Vikram to marry her and take responsibility in fulfilling her future, so Saranya marries him. But they don't accept each other as husband and wife. On confronting them, Sathya feels cheated and betrayed by Vikram.

The story revolves around Saranya's life in Vikram's joint family, with varied members. They start loving each other. Then they get married again. Later Vikram's enemies try to get Saranya aborted, but she escapes from all the problems. Then there is a seemantham for Saranaya. At last, the season ends.

Cast

Main
 Sharanya Turadi as Dr. Saranya Velraj
 is a daughter of Inspector Velraj, a police officer in Kodaikanal. She is amicable. However, after her father's death, she is forced to marry Vikram pertaining to a deal, according to which they get married and she enters Vikram's household.
 Amit Bhargav as ACP Vikram Sivakumar
 is an aspiring IPS Officer from a joint family background, he meets Sathya during a journey to Haridhwar and falls in love with her, but they are separated and in a turn of circumstances, he marries Saranya.
 Nisha Krishnan (episodes 1–120)/ Sowmya Rao Nadig (episodes 122 - 358) as Sathya Arjun
 is Vikram's ex-lover, who eventually marries Vikram's younger brother, Arjun, who leaves her after discovering her former relationship with Vikram. After Vikram's marriage to Saranya, she feels cheated and betrayed by Vikram.

Recurring
 Ashwanth Thilak as Arjun Sivakumar, Vikram's younger brother and Sathya's estranged husband, who after knowing the true extent of the former relationship between Vikram and Sathya, left Sathya and returned to the military, right after his marriage. Then he is known to be lost when he was in military camp.
 Anuradha as Akhilandeshwari, Vikram's paternal aunt 
 Afsar Babu as Sivakumar, Vikram and Arjun's father
 J. Lalitha as Jaya, Vikram and Arjun's mother
 Sri Durga as Priya, Akhilandeshwari's daughter, Arjun and Vikram's cousin
 Praveen/Aravish as Dileepan, Vikram, Arjun and Priya's cousin
 Preethi Kumar as Pavithra Dileepan, Dileepan's wife
 Dharini as Sridevi, Vikram, Arjun, Priya and Dileepan's aunt
 Murali Kumar as Dr. Balachandran, Vikram, Arjun, Priya and Dileepan's uncle and Saranya's Medical College Dean
 KL Mani as Arun Balachandran, Vikram, Arjun, Priya and Dileepan's cousin
 Sumathi Sri as Bhanumathy, Saranya's foster mother
 Dev Anand as Meenakshi Sundaram
 Franklin as Dileepan's father
 Kumaresan as Sathya's father
 Babitha as Sathya's mother

Former
 Nisha Ganesh as Sathya (episodes 1–120), replaced by Sowmya Rao Nadig on further episodes
 L. Raja as Inspector R. Velraj, Saranya's father
 Asha Rani as Bhagyalaxmi Balachandran, Vikram, Arjun, Priya and Dileepan's aunt
 Shyam as Santhosh, Saranya's classmate and friend
 Feroz Khan as Engine Bhaskar, a local goon and terrorist, obsessed with Saranya and with a grudge on Vikram
 Nesan as Mahesh (Thalaivar), a cruel politician and Bhaskar's brother
 Fouzil Hidhayah as Madhavi, Mahesh and Bhaskar's sister, who was in love with Vikram
 Meenakshi as Pavun Mahesh, Thalaivar's wife
 "Murattu Pandian" Baboos as Auto Arnold

Special appearances
 KPY Ramar as himself
 Abhinayashree as herself 
 Radhika Rao as Dhivya, to promote her new show Ponnukku Thanga Manasu

Production

Casting
Amit Bhargav was chosen due to his amazing performance in Kalyanam Mudhal Kadhal Varai. Priya Bhavani Shankar was chosen to play one of the female leads but she declined. News Anchor Sharanya Turadi Sundaraj later chosen, is making their debut with the series. Nisha Krishnan was chosen as well after her great performances in many shows on Vijay TV.later that role acted by Sowmya Rao Nadig  Later Sowmya was replaced role of Sathya in Episode: 122, formerly featured in the series Valli. Anuradha was cast to portray the negative role of Akhilandeshwari. Other supporting cast include Ashwanth Thilak, Sri Durga and J. Lalitha.

Development
On 27 August 2017, the first promo of the show one minute 'Song' was released by Vijay TV on YouTube. On 21 May 2017, the second, On 3 September 2017 promo of the show was released by Vijay TV.

Awards and nominations

References

External links
official website at Hotstar

Star Vijay original programming
Tamil-language romance television series
2017 Tamil-language television series debuts
Tamil-language television shows
Tamil-language television series based on Bengali-languages television series
2019 Tamil-language television series endings